Lu Ning (born 1 January 1994 in Jilin) is a professional snooker player from the People's Republic of China. 

Lu is among ten Chinese players currently suspended from the professional tour amid a match-fixing investigation. In January 2023, he was charged with being concerned in fixing matches and approaching players to fix matches, seeking to obstruct a WPBSA investigation, and betting on snooker matches.

Career
Lu's first appearance in a ranking tournament was in the wildcard round of the 2012 World Open, where he defeated 1996 British Open winner Nigel Bond 5–4 in Haikou. He met Mark Selby in the first round and, despite taking the first two frames, Lu lost 3–5.
Lu continued to show his talent in the next local ranking tournament, the 2012 China Open. He was awarded a wildcard to compete against Welsh player Jamie Jones, where Lu won 5–3. He won against 2005 world snooker champion Shaun Murphy by 5–2, with two centuries. However, in the second round Ali Carter won 5–1.

2012–13 season
In the 2012/2013 season Lu was awarded a place in the wildcard round for five ranking events, losing at this stage in four of them. At the International Championship he beat Barry Pinches 6–5, before losing in the first round 6–4 to Ricky Walden. He played in all three of the new Asian Players Tour Championships, but could not advance beyond the third round in any of them to finish 45th on the Asian Order of Merit.

2013–14 season
In July 2013 he became the IBSF Under 21 World Champion, defeating Zhou Yuelong 9–4 in the final. He came through the wildcard round of the Wuxi Classic by beating Adam Duffy 5–3, before losing 5–1 to Matthew Stevens. His Under-21 title earned him a two-year main tour card starting with the 2014/2015 season.

2014–15 season
Lu failed to qualify for any ranking events besides the UK Championship and the Welsh Open for which all players on the tour gain automatic entry at the venue stage. Lu lost 6–2 to Stephen Maguire in the first round of the UK and 4–0 to Ricky Walden at the Welsh. He was placed world number 114 after his first season as a professional.

2015–16 season
It was a similar story in the 2015/2016 season as Lu only reached the UK Championship and Welsh Open, losing in the first round of both. He was relegated from the tour at the end of the season due to being ranked 101st in the world, well outside of the top 64.

2018–19 season
Lu won his place on the snooker tour back for the 2018/19 season at the second event of Q School in May 2018. losing only 7 frames in six matches. He stated that he felt 'mentally ready' to resurrect his professional career after two years playing only on the Chinese tour.

He reached his first last 16 in the Northern Ireland Open, beating Craig Steadman, Alan McManus and Hammad Miah, before losing to David Gilbert. He repeated the feat in next tournament, the UK Championship, where he beat Anthony McGill, Mark Joyce and Luca Brecel, before losing 6–5 to Tom Ford despite missing several chances to win.

In February, Lu reached his first ranking quarter-final at the Indian Open, beating Robert Milkins, Liam Highfield, Yan Bingtao and Stuart Bingham, before losing to eventual champion Matt Selt. The win against Bingham featured an amazing final frame clearance including a fluked blue and a fortunate kiss on the black.

In the following tournament, the Gibraltar Open, Lu went one better, beating three amateurs and professionals Shaun Murphy and Tian Pengfei before losing to defending champion Ryan Day. This semi-final lifted him inside the top 50 on the one-year ranking list.

Performance and rankings timeline

Career finals

Ranking finals: 1

Amateur finals: 1 (1 title)

References

External links 

Lu Ning at worldsnooker.com

Living people
Chinese snooker players
Sportspeople from Jilin
1994 births
21st-century Chinese people